Kevin James McCann (born 11 September 1987) is a Scottish footballer who last played for East Kilbride. He is primarily a defender who can also play in a defensive midfield role. He has represented Scotland at under-20 and under-21 levels.

Club career

Hibernian
McCann started his senior career with Hibs. He made his first team debut in a Scottish Cup tie at Aberdeen on 10 January 2007. He remained in the first team squad after this and he appeared as a late substitute in Hibs' victory in the 2007 Scottish League Cup Final against Kilmarnock.

After the sale of Hibs' first choice right full-back Steven Whittaker to Rangers during the summer of 2007, it was expected that McCann would regularly play in the Hibs first team. McCann suffered from tendinitis in his right knee, which also led to him being withdrawn from the Scotland squad for the 2007 FIFA U-20 World Cup.

McCann's opportunities were further limited after the appointment of Mixu Paatelainen as manager. Paatelainen signed another right back, David van Zanten, for the 2008–09 season. McCann also suffered further problems with tendinitis in his right knee, which kept him out of action for the rest of the 2008–09 season. He resumed light training towards the end of the season.

McCann returned to fitness soon after the appointment of John Hughes as manager to the club. He played in the opening day win against St Mirren, but was subsequently injured again and did not make another appearance in the 2009–10 season.

After Hibs signed another right back during the 2010 close season (Michael Hart), McCann was loaned to Inverness Caledonian Thistle. McCann impressed in pre-season and started the first three league games. He scored his first goal for Inverness in his second league appearance, "an unstoppable shot into the top corner of the net from 30 yards" in a 4–0 win against Dundee United. McCann returned to Hibs in January 2011 at the end of his loan spell. Inverness manager Terry Butcher commented that he would have been signing McCann again, but he had suffered an injury that would prevent him from playing for up to eight weeks. McCann has not played for Hibs since returning from Inverness and he expected to be released at the end of the 2010–11 season. Hibs confirmed this in late April.

Greenock Morton
In August 2011, McCann played a trial match for Greenock Morton in the First Division victory over Livingston. On 22 August, McCann signed a short-term deal until January 2012. His contract was not extended following this deal and he was released.

Livingston
On 10 March 2012, he played in a trial match for Livingston against his former club Greenock Morton. Also setting up a goal for Iain Russell with a cross. After a further two games as a trialist, he signed for them on a short-term contract until the end of the season. McCann extended his stay with the West Lothian club by signing a new one-year contract in May 2012. McCann scored in a record victory, 8–0 against Stranraer in Scottish League Cup First round on 4 August 2012.

Raith Rovers
On 26 October 2013, McCann signed for Raith Rovers.

Warriors (Singapore)
When his deal at Raith Rovers ended coach Alex Weaver offered a contract to McCann who moved to Singapore, signing for S.League club Warriors Currently playing in a defensive midfield role where he scored his first S league goal against Harimau Muda B. Scoring also a vital 35-yard free kick against title rivals DPMM away in Brunei for Warriors to win 2–3. In his first season became a key player playing every match in the S.League winning season. He became the first Scottish player to ever win the Singapore S.League title. He won the 2014 S.League for Warriors; making it the club's ninth in their history.

Return to Scotland
McCann returned to Scotland in January 2016, signing for Scottish Championship side Falkirk on a short-term deal until the end of the season. Falkirk finished second in the league and were also runners-up in the play-off final.

In August 2016, McCann signed for Albion Rovers. After one season with the side, McCann moved to Lowland League side East Kilbride for the 2017–18 season.

International career
McCann was selected for Scotland under-21 after breaking into the Hibs first team. He also earned selection for Scotland under–20 in the lead up to the 2007 FIFA U-20 World Cup, but was prevented from playing in the tournament due to injury.

Honours
Hibernian
Scottish League Cup: 2007

Warriors
Singapore Premier League: 2014
Singapore Charity Shield: 2015

References

External links

 Kevin McCann Interview

1987 births
Living people
Footballers from Glasgow
Association football utility players
Scottish footballers
Scotland youth international footballers
Scotland under-21 international footballers
Hibernian F.C. players
Inverness Caledonian Thistle F.C. players
Greenock Morton F.C. players
Livingston F.C. players
Raith Rovers F.C. players
Warriors FC players
Falkirk F.C. players
Albion Rovers F.C. players
East Kilbride F.C. players
Scottish Premier League players
Scottish Football League players
Scottish Professional Football League players
Expatriate footballers in Singapore
Singapore Premier League players
Association football defenders
Association football midfielders
Lowland Football League players